Barrhead railway station is a railway station in the town of Barrhead, East Renfrewshire, Greater Glasgow, Scotland.

History 
The station was opened by the Glasgow, Barrhead and Neilston Direct Railway on 27 September 1848. The line southwards beyond Neilston (Low) to  via Dunlop (the Glasgow and Kilmarnock Joint Railway) was added between 1871 & 1873 by the Glasgow and South Western Railway and Caledonian Railway, giving travellers access to the G&SWR main line to Dumfries and Carlisle. The GB&NDR had originally been absorbed by the Caledonian Railway three years after completion, but was subsequently vested jointly into the CR and G&SWR by an Act of Parliament in 1869 in order to facilitate the extension southwards. Regular passenger services to the former G&SWR terminus at  ended with its closure in June 1966 - all services from here have henceforth used the former Caledonian station at Glasgow Central as their terminal.

The section south of here towards Kilmarnock was singled (with a loop at ) in 1973 as an economy measure, following the completion of electrification work on the Carlisle to Glasgow Central section of the West Coast Main Line. The section south of Lugton has since been partially redoubled, but Barrhead to Lugton remains single.

A new station building was officially opened on 27 September 1978 by the Chairman of Strathclyde Region's Highways and Transportation Committee. Constructed at a cost of £113,000, the new station building was finished in brown facing brick, stained timber boarding, blue/black slates and tinted glazing.

A signal box remains in operation to supervise the station area and control the single line stretch southwards.

Facilities 
The station has three platforms - one north-east facing bay (on the north-west side) specifically for terminating services and two through platforms, 1 and 2, which can be used for any service. A ticket machine serves platforms 2 and 3 whilst there is a staffed ticket office at street level adjacent to platform 1 (staffed Monday - Saturday 06:50 - 23:15, Sunday 09:10 - 16:50).  There are toilets and a pay phone on the concourse next to the ticket office.  Train running information is offered via timetable posters, digital departure screens, automated announcements and help points.  Level access is available to all platforms - via a lift to platform 1, a subway and ramps from the latter to platforms 2 and 3.  On a Sunday once the ticket office closes, All trains in both directions use Platform 2, This is because the ticket office is required to access Platform 1 and if this is closed, The platform can't be used however if its closed during the week for e.g a shortage of staff it will remain open.

Services

2008/2009 

2010 
There is also a train to/from either ,  or  roughly every half-hour. Again, a few train services run non-stop through the station.

2017

The current service pattern is:
 3tph to Glasgow Central, one of which starts in Kilmarnock, the other two start here.
 2tph terminate here from Glasgow Central, calling at Crossmyloof, Pollokshaws West, Kennishead, Priesthill & Darnley and Nitshill
 1tph to Kilmarnock (some continue to either Girvan or ) 
 6tpd to Carlisle, 3 of which are extended to Newcastle.

There is an hourly stopping service each way to Glasgow Central and Kilmarnock on Sundays.  Two of the latter continue to Carlisle.

2019-20
The winter 2019 timetable remains broadly the same as before, but with Newcastle departures reduced to just one in late afternoon.

Spring 2021

Due to the ongoing COVID-19 pandemic, a number of services have changed.

There are still 3 trains per hour to Glasgow Central during Mon-Sat day times. 1 non stop and the 2 stoppers (1 of these now runs to/from kilmarnock, there are 2 trains an hour to Kilmarnock with limited extensions beyond to Carlisle or Girvan/Stranraer, the Newcastle service currently on runs as far as Carlisle, and there are no services to Carlisle after 16:25 and no services at all after 20:00).

References

Notes

Sources

External links

 Video footage of Barrhead railway station
 RAILSCOT on Glasgow, Barrhead and Neilston Direct Railway
 RAILSCOT on Glasgow, Barrhead and Kilmarnock Joint Railway
 Barrhead station on navigable OS map

Railway stations in East Renfrewshire
Former Glasgow, Barrhead and Kilmarnock Joint Railway stations
Railway stations in Great Britain opened in 1848
SPT railway stations
Railway stations served by ScotRail
Barrhead